Interstate 74 (I-74) in the US state of Indiana traverses central parts of the state from west to east. It connects Champaign, Illinois, with Indianapolis in the center of the state, and Indianapolis with Cincinnati, Ohio.

Route description
I-74 crosses the Indiana–Illinois state line between Danville, Vermilion County, Illinois, and Highland Township, Vermillion County, Indiana. The Interstate retains its configuration as a four-lane freeway, and passes by an eastbound rest area just east of the state line. I-74 continues to head due east through a mix of rural woodland and farmland before it reaches a modified diamond interchange with State Road 63 (SR 63), which provides access to both the town of Newport, the county seat of Vermillion County, and the city of Terre Haute, the county seat of neighboring Vigo County, to the south.

East of SR 63, the freeway descends slightly to cross the Wabash River, where it leaves Vermillion County and crosses into Troy Township, Fountain County. I-74 ascends from river crossing and comes to a diamond interchange with South Stringtown Road, which provides access to the city of Covington to the north. The Interstate intersects US 231  later, providing access to Crawfordsville to the south. I-74 runs nearly parallel to US 136 from the Illinois border until US 136 terminates at I-465.

When I-74 reaches Indianapolis, it continues south, running concurrently with I-465 on the latter's western and southern segments. (The exits of this concurrency are numbered as if it were part of I-465 only.) I-74 is also concurrent with US 31, US 36, US 40, US 52, and several state highways, for varying lengths of its route around Indianapolis. I-74 crosses the White River and passes by the Indianapolis International Airport on the southwest side of Indianapolis. Once I-74 reaches the southeast side of Indianapolis, it diverges from I-465 and continues to the southeast. At this interchange, I-74 picks up US 421, with which it will run concurrently.

Outside of the Indianapolis area, I-74 continues southeast and runs past Shelbyville. Near the halfway point between Indianapolis and the Ohio border, I-74 runs through Greensburg. US 421 diverges and runs south through Greensburg. Continuing on east, I-74 runs parallel to SR 46. Just west of the Ohio border, I-74 crosses the Whitewater River. It also intersects with and begins a concurrency with US 52. The two roads then cross into Ohio at Harrison.

History

Initial construction
Like all Interstate Highways in Indiana, I-74 was constructed in segments. There were six segments in the western portion of the route between the Illinois state line and I-465 in Speedway, and six more in the eastern portion connecting I-465 near Beech Grove to the Ohio state line. The concurrent portions around Indianapolis on I-465, consisting of seven separate sections along the west and south legs of that beltway, became operational between December 21, 1961, and October 15, 1964. The eastern segments connecting Indianapolis and Cincinnati were also given a relatively high priority and were all completed and open by October 30, 1964.

The first section of I-74 to be built in Indiana was the portion from the Illinois state line east for just under  to the Covington exit just beyond the Wabash River, which opened to traffic in December 1960. The final  segment, located in Fountain and Montgomery counties on the western portion of the route, was finished and opened on August 31, 1967, marking the full completion of I-74 in the state.

Subsequent improvements

Exit list

References

External links

Indiana Highway Ends: Interstate 74

 Indiana
74
Transportation in Indianapolis
Transportation in Vermillion County, Indiana
Transportation in Fountain County, Indiana
Transportation in Montgomery County, Indiana
Transportation in Boone County, Indiana
Transportation in Hendricks County, Indiana
Transportation in Marion County, Indiana
Transportation in Shelby County, Indiana
Transportation in Decatur County, Indiana
Transportation in Franklin County, Indiana
Transportation in Ripley County, Indiana
Transportation in Dearborn County, Indiana